Münchner Kindl, meaning "Munich child" in the Bavarian dialect, is the name of the symbol on the coat of arms of the city of Munich.

History
This symbol has been the coat-of-arms of Munich since the 13th century. The figure portrayed was originally a monk (or friar) holding a Bible, but by the 16th century it evolved in different portrayals into the figure of a small child wearing a pointed hood, often shown holding a beer mug and a radish. It has been theorized that the name for the city of Munich (München in German) comes from the term  or "Cloister for Monks" due to the Imperial Abbey of Tegernsee--a Benedictine Monastery near which the original town of Munich was built. 

The image in its different configurations has appeared on countless different objects, from atop the city hall in Munich to manhole covers and even beer steins. The gender of the figure has also changed over the years: from a clearly male, to a gender-neutral child, to a small girl. Nowadays when the kindl is portrayed by a person - for instance, as a mascot for Oktoberfest - it is usually enacted by a young woman.

See also
Coat of arms of Munich

External links
 City Museum - Online

History of Munich
Culture in Munich
Heraldic charges